Ailstone is a village in Warwickshire, England. Population details can be found under Preston-on-Stour

External links 
 
 

Villages in Warwickshire